John David Stewart (August 2, 1833 – January 28, 1894) was a U.S. Representative from Georgia.

Born near Fayetteville, Georgia, Stewart attended the common schools and Marshall College, Griffin, Georgia.
Stewart taught school for two years in Griffin, Georgia. He studied law, and was admitted to the bar in 1856 and commenced practice in Griffin, Georgia. He served as Probate Judge of Spalding County from 1858 to 1860, and as a lieutenant and the captain in the Thirteenth Georgia Regiment of the Confederate States Army during the Civil War.

After the Civil War, Stewart served as member of the State House of Representatives from 1865 to 1867. He then studied theology, and was ordained as a minister of the Baptist Church in 1871. He served as mayor of Griffin in 1875 and 1876, and as Judge of the Superior Court from 7 November 1879 to 1 January 1886, when he resigned to become a candidate for Congress.

Stewart was elected as a Democrat to the Fiftieth and Fifty-first Congresses (March 4, 1887 – March 3, 1891), although was unsuccessful in renomination in 1890. He returned to practice law until his death in Griffin, Georgia, 28 January 1894. He was interred in Oak Hill Cemetery.

References

External links 
 

1833 births
1894 deaths
Confederate States Army officers
Mayors of Griffin, Georgia
Democratic Party members of the Georgia House of Representatives
Baptist ministers from the United States
Georgia (U.S. state) state court judges
Democratic Party members of the United States House of Representatives from Georgia (U.S. state)
19th-century American politicians
19th-century American judges
19th-century American clergy